The first election to Cumberland Council was held on 5 May 2022. All 46 seats were up for election.

Results
Labour won a majority of 30 seats.

Changes are shown from the Cumbria County Council elections in 2017

Division results

Allerdale area

Aspatria

Bothel & Wharrels

Cockermouth North

Cockermouth South

Dearham & Broughton

Harrington

Keswick

Maryport North

Maryport South

Moss Bay and Moorclose

Seaton

Solway Coast

St John's & Great Clifton

St Michael's

Thursby

Wigton

Carlisle area

Belah

Belle Vue

Botcherby

Brampton

Castle

Corby & Hayton

Currock

Dalston & Burgh

Denton Holme

Harraby North

Harraby South

Houghton & Irthington

Longtown

Morton

Stanwix Urban

Upperby

Wetheral

Yewdale

Copeland area

Bransty 

Charles Maudling stood as an Independent in 2017, and the change is shown from his vote in that election. The change from the Conservative candidate's vote was -14.6%.

Cleator Moor East & Frizington

Cleator Moor West

Egremont

Egremont North & St Bees

Gosforth

Hillcrest & Hensingham

Howgate

Kells & Sandwith

Millom

Millom Without

Mirehouse

References

Cumberland
Cumberland Council elections